Dahiri may refer to:

Sindhi people
Dahiri, Ivory Coast